The 122nd Massachusetts General Court, consisting of the Massachusetts Senate and the Massachusetts House of Representatives, met in 1901 during the governorship of Winthrop M. Crane. Rufus A. Soule served as president of the Senate and James J. Myers served as speaker of the House.

Senators

Representatives

See also
 57th United States Congress
 List of Massachusetts General Courts

References

Further reading

External links
 
 

Political history of Massachusetts
Massachusetts legislative sessions
massachusetts
1901 in Massachusetts